Wyatt Bardouille is a Seattle-based independent film and media producer/director and actor. She is currently the Executive Producer at Bardouille Productions.

Originally from Indiana (with Dominican roots), Bardouille obtained a degree in computer engineering at the University of Michigan.  She worked at Microsoft and Expedia and in 2004, decided to pursue a career in filmmaking. She attended the Seattle Film Institute for post-baccalaureate studies in Filmmaking.

She has worked mainly on short films. With author and public relations specialist Whitney Keyes, she co-hosted, produced and directed WhitneyandWyatt.com in 2007, one of the first independent, web-based talk shows for women. Most recently, she has produced and directed the award-winning 2011 documentary Dominica: Charting a Future for Paradise, which received the award for Best Documentary Short at the 2012 Third World Independent Film Festival.

Works
 Dominica: Charting a Future for Paradise, 2011. Producer and Director.
 A Natural Life, 2008. Producer.
 World Enough and Time, 2006. Post-Production Coordinator.
 The Dime, 2006. Director.
 Needle Pulling Thread, 2006. Assistant Director.

References

External links
Bardouille Productions
Dominica: Charting a Future for Paradise
WhitneyandWyatt.com
"Dominica-Wyatt Bardouille" (interview with Andrew Tsao), Backstory: The Filmmaker's Vision, University of Washington, November 14, 2013.

Filmmakers from Seattle
American women film directors
University of Michigan College of Engineering alumni
Living people
American film directors
American people of Dominica descent
American women film producers
Film producers from Washington (state)
Year of birth missing (living people)
21st-century American women